José Elpys Espinal Marte (born 14 November 1982) is a Dominican footballer who plays as a forward. He also holds Italian citizenship.

He is the twin brother of Vinicio Espinal.

Career
Along with his twin brother Edwards Vinicio Espinal, both started their career at Atalanta. José left for Serie C1 clubs from 2001 to 2003 and from 2003 to 2005 played at Serie D clubs. He played all 4 matches in promotion playoffs 2005, and scored 5 goals.

In 2005, he returned to professional football for Sanremese at Serie C2. In the next season he signed for Novara of Serie C1. He failed secured a regular place in 2007–08 season, and left for Lega Pro Seconda Divisione clubs on loan.

On 31 August 2009, José Espinal was swapped for Christian Jidayi of Cesena. He played his first Serie B match for Cesena on 5 January 2010.

On 20 January 2010 he was loaned to Giacomense.

On 13 July 2010 he signed a one-year contract for the newly promoted Belgian club AS Eupen.

In December 2013, Espinal joined to Carlin's Boys.

Internationally, José received his first call for Dominican Republic in August 2011 to participate in two 2014 World Cup qualifying matches against El Salvador and Surinam, but he did not appear. He made his senior debut on 30 August 2014, when he was a starter in a lost friendly against El Salvador.

References

External links
 Profile at La Gazzetta dello Sport 
 Profile at Football.it 

1982 births
Living people
Sportspeople from Santo Domingo
Dominican Republic footballers
Atalanta B.C. players
U.C. AlbinoLeffe players
Novara F.C. players
A.C. Cesena players
Serie A players
Serie B players
Belgian Pro League players
Challenger Pro League players
Association football forwards
Rovigo Calcio players
Virtus Bergamo Alzano Seriate 1909 players
S.S.D. Sanremese Calcio players
A.C. Giacomense players
Twin sportspeople
Dominican Republic twins
Dominican Republic international footballers
Dominican Republic expatriate footballers
Dominican Republic expatriate sportspeople in Italy
Expatriate footballers in Italy
Dominican Republic expatriate sportspeople in Belgium
Expatriate footballers in Belgium